Aratlı-Curuğlu (known as İkinci Aratkənd until 1992) is a village and municipality in the Agsu Rayon of Azerbaijan. It has a population of 556.

References

Populated places in Agsu District